Sealdah–Berhampore Court MEMU is a passenger train of the Indian Railways which runs between  and , both within West Bengal.

Average speed and frequency

References
63105/Sealdah - Berhampore Court MEMU
63106/Lalgola - Sealdah MEMU

Railway services introduced in 2013
Rail transport in West Bengal
Electric multiple units of India
Berhampore